Rolling Stone Covered Bridge is a burr-arch road bridge built in 1915 over Big Walnut Creek, Indiana.

Construction
This Burr Arch bridge is 103 feet (31.4m) long.

Nearby Bridges
 Baker's Camp Bridge
 Pine Bluff Bridge

References

Covered bridges in Indiana
Transportation buildings and structures in Putnam County, Indiana
Tourist attractions in Putnam County, Indiana
Road bridges in Indiana
Wooden bridges in Indiana
Burr Truss bridges in the United States